Duliajan Oil City is a census town in Dibrugarh district  in the state of Assam, India. It is the headquarters of Oil India Limited, a PSU undertaking of crude petroleum and Oil industry.

Demographics
 India census, Duliajan Oil Town had a population of 21,707. Males constitute 53% of the population and females 47%. Duliajan Oil Town has an average literacy rate of 84%, higher than the national average of 59.5%: male literacy is 87% and, female literacy is 80%. In Duliajan Oil Town, 10% of the population is under 6 years of age.

References

Cities and towns in Dibrugarh district
Dibrugarh